Robert E. "Pastor Bob" Miles (January 28, 1925 – August 16, 1992) was a white supremacist theologist and religious leader from Michigan.

Biography 
A major "dualist" religious leader, Miles allied himself with various groups that constituted the racist and anti-Semitic political-religious movement known as Christian Identity, including Aryan Nations, founding the Mountain Church of Jesus Christ the Savior on his property. Miles saw Earth as the site of a battle between a true God and a false god, with Jews acting as agents of the false God against the true "chosen people" that would be "white Aryans". According to the political scientist Michael Barkun, his dualistic theology was important despite its idiosyncrasies, and "the avuncular Miles functioned as a kind of elder statesman of the racial movement".

In 1971, Miles, former Grand Dragon of the Michigan Ku Klux Klan (KKK), was arrested for conspiring to bomb school buses in an attempt to stop the forced busing in Michigan. The media billed it as a "Klan trial" even though Miles had not been associated with the KKK for some time. He was later convicted and served his sentence.

Following the Greensboro Massacre where anti-Klan communist activists were killed, "a number of previously antagonistic White Supremacist groups, including the Posse Comitatus and various Neo-Nazi and Klan factions, began having discussions about how they could formulate a common ideology. These different groups also conducted joint activities and even began establishing informal means of communication including computer bulletin boards and cable TV programs. Many of these groups embraced Christian Identity. Gradually, a White racist alliance emerged. Centers of this movement included Miles' Michigan farm, as well as the Aryan Nations compound in Hayden Lake, Idaho, the site of Identity Pastor Richard Butler's Church of Jesus Christ Christian.

In the early 1980s, Miles endorsed the Northwest Territorial Imperative in his seminar Birth of a Nation. According to him, White Americans constitutes a separate racial nation and urged white nationalists to establish a separate white state in the Pacific Northwest. "Let us go in peace", he wrote, "let us be considered a Racial Nation of Aryans." Coupled with his increasingly anti-US government position, he was referred to as a "Klanarchist".

References

Christian Identity
Ku Klux Klan Grand Dragons
1925 births
1992 deaths
People from Michigan